Excitable Boy is the third studio album by American musician Warren Zevon. The album was released on January 18, 1978, by Asylum Records. It includes the single "Werewolves of London", which reached No. 21 and remained in the American Top 40 for six weeks. The album brought Zevon to commercial attention and remains the best-selling album of his career, having been certified platinum by the RIAA and reaching the top ten on the US Billboard 200. A remastered and expanded edition was released in 2007.

Music and lyrics 
"Excitable Boy" and "Werewolves of London" were considered macabrely humorous by some critics. The historical "Veracruz" dramatizes the United States occupation of Veracruz. It was the first song Zevon wrote with Jorge Calderón. Likewise, "Roland the Headless Thompson Gunner" is a fictionalized account of former mercenary David Lindell's experiences in Africa. "Lawyers, Guns and Money" is a tongue-in-cheek tale of a young American man's adventures in Cold War-era Latin America. In addition, there are two ballads about life and relationships ("Accidentally Like a Martyr" and "Tenderness on the Block"), as well as the funk/disco-inspired "Nighttime in the Switching Yard".

Critical reception 
Reviewing in Christgau's Record Guide: Rock Albums of the Seventies (1981), Robert Christgau wrote:

Track listing

Personnel
 Warren Zevon – lead, harmony and backing vocals, piano, organ, synthesizer
 Jorge Calderón – harmony and backing vocals, Spanish vocals on "Veracruz"
 Danny Kortchmar - guitar, percussion
 Russ Kunkel – drums

Additional personnel
 Karla Bonoff – harmony vocals on "Accidentally Like a Martyr"
 Jackson Browne – guitar, harmony and backing vocals
 Luis Damian – jarana on "Veracruz"
 Kenny Edwards – bass guitar on "Veracruz", "Tenderness on the Block" and "Lawyers, Guns and Money"
 John McVie - bass on "Werewolves of London"
 Mick Fleetwood – drums on "Werewolves of London"
 The Gentlemen Boys (Jackson Browne, Jorge Calderón, Kenny Edwards, J. D. Souther and Waddy Wachtel) – backing and harmony vocals
 Arthur Gerst – Mexican harp
 Bob Glaub – bass guitar on "Roland the Headless Gunner", "Excitable Boy" and "Nighttime in the Switching Yard"
 Jim Horn – recorder on "Veracruz"; saxophone on "Excitable Boy"
 Greg Ladanyi – bells on "Nighttime in the Switching Yard"
 Rick Marotta – drums on "Veracruz" and "Lawyers, Guns and Money"
 Jeff Porcaro – drums and percussion on "Nighttime in the Switching Yard"
 Linda Ronstadt – backing and harmony vocals on "Excitable Boy"
 Leland Sklar – bass guitar on "Johnny Strikes Up The Band" and "Accidentally Like a Martyr" 
 J.D. Souther – backing and harmony vocals
 Manuel Vasquez – requinto on "Veracruz"
 Waddy Wachtel – guitar, synthesizer, harmony and backing vocals
 Jennifer Warnes – harmony vocals on "Excitable Boy"

Charts

Weekly charts

Year-end charts

Certifications

References

Warren Zevon albums
1978 albums
Albums produced by Waddy Wachtel
Albums with cover art by Jimmy Wachtel
Asylum Records albums